Burak Tozkoparan (born 14 November 1992) is a Turkish actor and drummer.

Life and career 
His family are of Laz descent, from Rize. On 2 April 2011, he won the Best Drummer award at the 14th High School Music Contest held at Bostancı Show Center. After representing the Turkish Kızılayı Kartal Anatolian High School at the contest, he enrolled in Okan University, pursuing a degree in cinema and television studies. Meanwhile, he continued his career as a musician as a member of different bands. For while, together with Olcayto Ahmet Tuğsuz he formed the band Pervane, in which he served as the drummer.

His television debut came with a role in Star TV's drama series Paramparça as Ozan Gürpınar. He joined in youth series Kırgın Çiçekler, sport series "Tek Yürek" and series Menajerimi Ara which adaptation of French series. He played in comedy drama series "Gençliğim Eyvah". He played in period series Destan. In 2023, He is playing in drama series "Ateş Kuşları".

He also had his cinematic debut with a role in Gönenç Uyanık's 2016 movie Hesapta Aşk, in which he portrayed the character of Mert. Alongside Hayal Köseoğlu, he appeared in the film Sesinde Aşk Var.

Filmography

Awards and nominations

References

External links 
 
 

Living people
Turkish male television actors
Turkish male film actors
1992 births